Margaret Alberta Armen (September 9, 1921 – November 10, 2003) was an American screenwriter and author.

Biography
She was born Margaret Alberta Sampsell in Washington, D.C., the daughter of Commander Thomas Lloyd Sampsell and Florence Neilson (née Buehler). Her father was a dental surgeon serving in the United States Navy Dental Corps, and she grew up in Manila, Panama, Japan, and spent four years living in Peking, China, where she learned Mandarin.

She graduated with a degree in English literature from the University of California, Berkeley, then studied creative writing at University of California, Los Angeles. On June 30, 1945, she married Garo Armen, a naval officer, and started a family. While raising her son, she worked from home, writing newspaper articles and short stories, before finally breaking into television writing Westerns, furnishing scripts for Dick Powell's Zane Grey Theatre (1960), The Rebel (1961), Lawman (1960–62), The Tall Man (1962), The Rifleman (1960–63) and The Big Valley (1965–69) during the 1960s.

She was also responsible for three episodes of the original Star Trek series, writing "The Gamesters of Triskelion" and "The Paradise Syndrome" (both 1968), and provided the final teleplay for "The Cloud Minders" (1969). She later wrote two episodes of Star Trek: The Animated Series ("The Lorelei Signal" and "The Ambergris Element", both 1973). Armen also co-wrote (with Alfred Harris) "The Savage Syndrome", an episode of the cancelled series Star Trek: Phase II.

During the 1970s, she also wrote episodes for the detective series Ironside (1973), Cannon (1975), Baretta (1977) and Barnaby Jones (1977, 1978), as well as the science fiction series The Six Million Dollar Man (1975), Land of the Lost (1974, 1975), The Bionic Woman (1978) and Jason of Star Command (1979).

In the early 1980s, she wrote episodes of Fantasy Island (1981), Flamingo Road (1981) and Emerald Point N.A.S. (1983). Although primarily a writer for episodic television, she wrote the television movie The New Daughters of Joshua Cabe (1976) for the series ABC Movie of the Week. Armen ceased writing for television in 1983, publishing the western novel The Hanging of Father Miguel in 1984.

Armen was a member of Western Writers of America from 1968, and also served on the board of governors of the Television Academy for two years from 1970, and on the board of directors of the Writers Guild of America, West, for three years from 1975.

Armen died of heart failure in 2003 at her home in Woodland Hills, Los Angeles, and is buried at Forest Lawn Memorial Park, Hollywood Hills.

Filmography

Television

References

External links
 
 
 
 

1921 births
2003 deaths
Screenwriters from Washington, D.C.
American women television writers
American television writers
20th-century American novelists
American women novelists
Burials at Forest Lawn Memorial Park (Hollywood Hills)
20th-century American screenwriters
20th-century American women writers
American expatriates in Panama
American expatriates in the Philippines
American expatriates in Japan
American expatriates in China
21st-century American women